Verva ActiveJet is a former Polish UCI Professional Continental cycling team, active between 2014 and 2016.

Roster

Roster in 2016:

Major wins
2014
Stage 2 Memorial Grundmanna I Wizowskiego, Konrad Dąbkowski
Stage 1 Course de Solidarność et des Champions Olympiques, Konrad Dąbkowski
Puchar Uzdrowisk Karpackich, Paweł Franczak
Puchar Ministra Obrony Narodowej, Konrad Dąbkowski
2015
Stage 1 GP Liberty Seguros, Paweł Bernas
Overall Volta ao Alentejo, Paweł Bernas
Stage 4, Paweł Bernas
Overall Szlakiem Grodów Piastowskich, Paweł Bernas
Stage 3, Paweł Bernas
Visegrad 4 Bicycle Race – GP Czech Republic, Paweł Bernas

References

External links
 

Cycling teams established in 2014
Cycling teams based in Poland
Former UCI Professional Continental teams
2014 establishments in Poland
UCI Continental Teams (Europe)
Cycling teams disestablished in 2016
2016 disestablishments in Poland